is a Japanese actor. He won the award for best actor at the 7th Hochi Film Award and the award for best supporting actor at the 4th Yokohama Film Festival for Fall Guy.

Filmography

Films
Fall Guy (1982), Yasu
Theater of Life (1983)
Time and Tide (1984)
Shanghai Rhapsody (1984)
Final Take (1986)
Love & Pop (1998)
First Love (2000)
The Man In White (2003)
The Ode to Joy (2006)
Southbound (2007)
The Lone Scalpel (2010)
Rebirth (2011)
The Woodsman and the Rain (2011)
Angel Home (2013)
The Mourner (2015)
Gukoroku: Traces of Sin (2017)
And Then There Was Light (2017)
Memoirs of a Murderer (2017)
We Are (2018)
5 Million Dollar Life (2019)
Listen to the Universe (2019)
Fukushima 50 (2020)
The Asadas (2020)
Dreaming of the Meridian Arc (2022)
Call Me Chihiro (2023), Bitō

Television
Bakumatsu Seishun Graffiti: Fukuzawa Yukichi (1985) - John Manjirō
Dokuganryū Masamune (1987) - Suzuki Motonobu
Journey Under the Midnight Sun (2006)
Barefoot Gen (2007)
SP (2007–2008)
Last Friends (2008)
Mori no Asagao (2010)
Hana Moyu (2015) - Dr. Yamane Bunki
Shingari (2015)
Midnight Diner: Tokyo Stories (2016)
Kenji Miyazawa's Table (2017) - Masajirō Miyazawa
Segodon (2018) - Ōkubo Jiemon
Showa Genroku Rakugo Shinju (2018) - Yūrakutei Yakumo VII
Yell (2020) - Kinsuke Uchikoshi
Reach Beyond the Blue Sky (2021) - Kawaji Toshiakira

References

External links
 

1953 births
Japanese male actors
Living people
Actors from Aichi Prefecture